The Guernsey Football Association, also simply known as the Guernsey FA or the GFA, is the body that co-ordinates and organises the sport of football in Guernsey. Although, as a Crown Dependency, Guernsey is not a part of the United Kingdom, the local FA is affiliated with the English FA, and acts as a county football association.

Organisation
The organisation runs the Guernsey national football team (which competes in the Muratti Vase and the Island Games), the Guernsey league representative XI (which competes in the FA National League System Cup) and the Priaulx League, the main league competition on the island.

The representative XI won the National League Cup in 2010 and qualified for the UEFA Regions Cup, where they were eliminated in the group stages in Macedonia. Following this run, the GFA proposed to establish a club which would join the English Football Pyramid in an attempt to offer the island's senior elite players the opportunity to progress further and test themselves at a higher level. In 2011 Guernsey F.C. was created.

The Guernsey FA is based at The Corbet Field (home of Member Club Vale Recreation F.C.), in Saint Sampson, Guernsey.

Chris Schofield was appointed Chairman in 2010 and replaced Mark Le Tissier who left to set up Guernsey F.C.

In March 2012, former Oxford United FC trainee, Angus Mackay, was appointed as the football development officer.

Competitions

Leagues 
Priaulx League
Jackson League
Railway League 1
Railway League 2
Veterans League 
Under 18 Development League
Under 16 Development League
Under 15 Development League 
Under 14 Development League
Under 13 Development League 
Under 12 Development League 
Women's League

Cups 
Guernsey FA Cup
Stranger Charity Cup (Priaulx League teams)
Mauger Cup (Jackson League teams)
Rouget Cup (Railway League teams)
Old Vic Cup (Under 18 Development League)
Loveridge Cup (Under 18 Development League)
Normandie Cup (Under 16 Development League teams)
Duquemin Cup (Under 16 Development League teams)
MJ Le Prevost Cup (Under 14 Development League teams)
Le Vallee Cup
Women's Knock-out Cup
Women's Secondary Cup
Frederick Martinez Cup (for top two Priaulx League sides from the previous season)
Rawlinson Cup

Presidents of the Guernsey Football Association

Football stadiums in Guernsey

See also 
Guernsey national football team

References

External links
Guernsey FA official website

Football in Guernsey
County football associations
Association football governing bodies in Europe
Sports organizations established in 1893